Han Da-sol is a South Korean actress. She is known for her roles in dramas such as Men Are Men, Twelve Nights, The Smile Has Left Your Eyes, and Happiness. She also appeared in movies Hot Young Bloods, The Mayor, and Dragon Inn Part 2: The Night of the Gods.

Filmography

Television series

Film

Music video appearances

References

External Links 
 
 

1995 births
Living people
21st-century South Korean actresses
South Korean television actresses
South Korean film actresses